Rock On 2 (also known as Rock On!! 2) is a 2016 Indian Hindi-language musical drama film directed by Shujaat Saudagar, and produced by Farhan Akhtar and Ritesh Sidhwani. A sequel to the National film award winning film Rock On!! (2008). The soundtrack of the film was composed by Shankar–Ehsaan–Loy. Arjun Rampal, Akhtar, Purab Kohli and Prachi Desai reprise their roles from the original film whereas Shraddha Kapoor and Shashank Arora appear in new roles. Unlike its predecessor, the film was unsuccessful at the box office.

Plot
The film starts with Joseph "Joe" Mascarenhas (Arjun Rampal) being introduced to the audience. Joe is now a judge at a successful reality show and working partner at Club Bar & Blues, where he often meets his other friend from the band Magik, Kedar "KD" Zaveri (Purab Kohli), better known as Killer Drummer. As the story goes on, KD narrates how Aditya "Adi" Shroff (Farhan Akhtar), Magik's lead singer, left the city and its comforts due to a haunting nightmare and a painful experience. He has been living now for five years in Cherrapunji, a town near Shillong, Meghalaya.

Jiah Sharma (Shraddha Kapoor), a young music programmer, who lives with her father, Pandit Vibhuti Sharma (Kumud Mishra), referred to by Jiah affectionately as "Baba", was once a great Sarod player and revered all over the world. She finds that a young boy Uday Brijkishore Mishra (Shashank Arora), has come over to Baba and wants to learn music and the Sarod from him. However, since he is too scared to even listen to how perfectly Uday is playing the Sarod due to memories of his late son instantly being triggered, Baba leaves the room. Jiah convinces Uday to continue his struggles and assures him that his harsh days will soon come to an end. Uday also learns about Jiah's singing talent and plays a Sarod composition of the song Jiah recorded. Jiah records this composition on a CD which he will takes to the Club Bar & Blues studio against Uday's, headed by Joe. Surprisingly, the CD happens to bring about a huge twist of fate and also reunite band members of Magik in the process.

Meanwhile, on his birthday, Adi is visited by Joe and KD along with Adi's wife Sakshi (Prachi Desai) and Joe's wife Debbie (Shahana Goswami). Adi finds his son, Rob (whom he has named after Magik's only late member, Rob Nancy (Luke Kenny), sleeping in the car and wakes him up. As they later gather together, Joe and KD find Adi's poetry in his diary and ask him if he has a new tune they can play. The next morning, a regular chat between the trio swiftly turns into a past-hunting argument. This soon revealed that Adi is tormented by the failure of his music label in Mumbai, which took away, along with the money invested, a young, aspiring artist's life. KD blames Adi for trying to run away, while Adi ends up accusing Joe of being money-centric. However, the argument soon ceases, and Joe asks Adi to calm down as it is his birthday. They finally reconcile after an adventure. Sakshi asks Adi to return to Mumbai, but he refuses. The next day, Adi bids goodbye to his friend, and KD promises to return with Adi's bike and friends in three days' time. The film flashes back to Magik's old days.

Adi returns to his old life and recalls how a young boy, Rahul Sharma (Priyanshu Painyuli), wanted to give him a demo tape of his recordings, but Adi's losses and rude behavior towards him forced the young boy to commit suicide, an event that Adi still hasn't gotten over yet. To make matters worse, he loses his hard-gained self-help when his cooperative, his farm, and his school all catch fire. Left with nothing, he travels to Cherrapunji, where he comes across Jiah. Adi faints when Jiah tends to him. The next day, KD discovers him, urges him to return to Mumbai and try moving on. Uday and Jiah are called by Joe to the studio, where Jiah meets Adi and later performs her song live in the studio.

Magik members find the song really good and suggest Jiah sing in an upcoming concert. But telling a lie to Baba on that pretext shames Jiah into recalling how Baba criticized modern-day music, calling it a destroyer of the soulfulness and purity of the art. She runs away from the concert. A scuffle between Joe and KD soon brings up truth to the surface, and Adi and his friends eventually take a shocking retreat when Uday informs them that Baba is Jiah's father and that Rahul, the boy who killed himself, is Jiah's brother. Amidst a highly tense atmosphere, while Joe refuses to cooperate with Adi and KD in their thoughts of apologizing to Jiah, the story flashes back to five years earlier when Rahul tried to attack Adi. The resulting fight attracted a threat from Rahul, following which Rahul killed himself by the time Adi and KD heard his CD and decided to call him. Jiah learns of the truth and breaks off all contact with Magik and Uday and recalls how Baba chided Rahul for ruining the art of Indian music despite his pleadings and valid excuses.

Adi learns of some problems in the town in Meghalaya where he had been living, and this causes a rift between him and Sakshi, who is upset that he does not have time for her. Adi lands at the airport, where he encounters Jiah again, but they are unable to get over Rahul's death. Finally, after some hard thinking, Jiah visits Adi in the village and convinces him to stop brooding over Rahul's suicide, stating that he was so dejected with life that he ended up messing with Adi's life as well. Adi visits the camp, but there is not much funding available, so Joe and KD come up with the idea of organizing a rock concert with some known bands to raise collective funds. However, as soon as Mahender, the state welfare board chief, who had earlier gotten into an egoistic argument with Adi, learns of this, he orders an ambush on the concert venue, thus ruining everything.

That very day, Baba is called by a news reporter and is surprised to learn that Jiah is at the venue of the attack. During a heated argument, Jiah vents out to Baba that it was he who had killed Rahul by not motivating him what he needed badly in life. Baba breaks down and drops the phone. Meanwhile, a contestant from Joe's reality show, Mannjyot, brings some equipment as a replacement for the broken setup. The concert becomes a success even as Adi gets Jiah to overcome her fears and apprehensions. The village recovers from its crisis as Mahender is forced to release funds, and Magik reunites eventually, with Uday as a new member, and Jiah becomes a singing sensation.

Cast
 Arjun Rampal as Joseph "Joe" Mascarehas, a reality show judge and club owner
 Farhan Akhtar as Aditya "Adi" Shroff, Magik's lead singer
 Shraddha Kapoor as Jiah Sharma, a singer and a programmer
 Prachi Desai as Sakshi Shroff, Adi's wife
 Purab Kohli as Kedar Zaveri a.k.a. Killer Drummer
 Shashank Arora as Uday Brijkishore Mishra, an aspiring musician
 Kumud Mishra as Pandit Vibhuti Sharma (Baba), Jiah's father
 Priyanshu Painyuli as Rahul Sharma, Jiah's brother
 Dinesh Kumar as Mannjyot
 Luke Kenny as Rob Nancy (cameo), Magik's late member
 Shahana Goswami as Debbie Mascarenhas (cameo), Joe's wife  
 Sunidhi Chauhan as herself (cameo), a Sa Re Ga Ma Pa judge 
 Salim Merchant as himself (cameo), a Sa Re Ga Ma Pa judge
 Usha Uthup as herself (cameo)
 Vishal Dadlani as himself (cameo)

Production

Development
After the release of the first film, a sequel was planned to be made. However, a follow-up went through prolonged development hell for almost 8 years. According to Rampal, this was because "it was important to figure out the story." The idea of the sequel was to have the same characters, but explore where they are now after 8 years. Pubali Chaudhuri spent 3 years writing the script. During the development phase, the film was initially intended to take place in Himachal Pradesh, but following the attacks of Manipuri students in Delhi, the producers decided to alter the film's setting. Saudagar was watching the incident on the news when Akhtar pinged him up where the two discussed on the issue. Neither him or Akhtar had been to the North East before, but Kohli who had visited many places there, so he suggested Meghalaya and Shillong, as Shillong is also called the "rock capital." Initially, the decision was met with some resistance. Saudagar remarked that the main intent was to bring the North East to Hindi cinema and also highlight the issue of people facing in the state.

The producers decided that there would be no romantic relationship or love story between the two leads. Saudagar stated, "Rock On 2 is not about an extramarital affair. It’s a story of human bonds and is based on modern relationships."

Pre-production

In 2011, Saudagar received a call from Sidhwani who wanted him to be a second unit director in Don 2 (2011). Ever since then the two kept in touch with each other. Then in 2013, Sidhwani once again approached him to see if he would be interested in helming a sequel to Rock On!! as a lead director to which he agreed. Saudagar admits that he is not in favor of sequels, but grew interested in this one after reading the coherent script.

Akhtar had always wanted to make a film in Northeast India and stated that the film is a tribute to the people of the North-East and an attempt to bring the whole region into mainstream pop culture. Also, the film has been called a "visual treat" under the parts shot in Northeast India.

Casting
Aside from newcomers Kapoor and Arora, the principal cast from the original film all returned for the sequel. The only member from the film's band Magik who did not return for the follow-up was Luke Kenny as his character died in the first film, while Rampal, Akhtar and Kohli all reprised their respective roles, making it a rare occurrence in Bollywood. The only other Bollywood sequel to have the three leads return for a sequel was Pyaar Ka Punchnama 2 (2015). After Rampal won the National Film Award for Best Supporting Actor at the 56th National Film Awards in 2008 for his role in Rock On!!, he rejected all offers thereafter to play a lead role as a musician.

Kapoor plays Jiah Sharma, a keyboard player, programmer and a singer. She was an ardent fan of the original film and cites the recurring theme of music band and friendship [in the first film] as her prime reason wanting to star in the sequel. After watching the film in theater, she told her father that if there be made a sequel, she would be in it. When she first heard that the filmmakers were making a sequel, she called up Sidhwani to ask if she could be considered for a part. She met Sidhwani and the production team who mainly wanted to hear her sing. She gave a singing audition to composer trio Shankar–Ehsaan–Loy. Although Kapoor had sung before in her previous films, this marks the first time that the singer-actress sings rock songs. Whilst growing up, she took training in classical music from her grandmother, Pandharinath Kolhapure, but had to cease training after her grandmother died. For the film, Kapoor undertook vocal training with Samantha Edwards, a jazz vocalist, in order to adapt the rock genre correctly. Her biggest inspirations as a singer are her grandmother Lata Mangeshkar and her mother Shivangi Kapoor (née Kolhapure). She said that part of what inspired her to star in the film was watching Farhan Akhtar in the original film write his own songs and perform them. Rampal was a little skeptic and grew wary when he first heard about Kapoor's involvement in the film since "she is from a different generation". But, upon hearing her vocals, it instead provided him inspiration.

Kapoor says she and her character Jiah shares little resemblance. While she had a sheltered upbringing and would always travel with companies, Jiah on the other hand, is a loner and reclusive character who chooses to remain aloof and would rather live and travel alone. Saudagar would make her undergo a training process in which she spent as much time alone as possible with herself in order for her to connect to her character. Travelling to Shillong was in a way helpful for this process as she was away from her family. In some instances, she would put up "do not disturb" sign on the door.

The film also marks the third time that Akhtar plays a father in a feature film after Shaadi Ke Side Effects (2014) and in Wazir (2016).

The film also includes budding star Priyanshu Painyuli who plays Kapoor's brother, who plays a crucial role in the story.

Principal photography

Principal photography began in Shillong, Meghalaya on 6 October 2015 and the film was shot in numeours other locations in the eastern part of the state, including Umniuh Village in Ri-Bhoi district, Cherrapunjee and Laitlum. Prior to filming, a memorandum of understanding was signed between Excel Entertainment and the Government of Meghalaya in July 2015. Since the script demanded picturesque, mountainous locations, Sidhwani chose Shillong and its adjacent places in the state of Meghalaya as the ideal locations. Sidhwani visited the state in February 2015 for scouting filming locations. In an interview with The Northeast Today, Akhtar stated that Shillong was the natural choice because of its close history with music saying "we all know that Shillong has a huge history with rock music and it was an obvious choice for the movie," while Saudagar said this was due to the city's passion for rock music. The film was initially set to take place in Himachal Pradesh. By August 2015, the whole cast and crew had arrived in the city to begin production. Akhtar mingled with the people in the villages in order to understand their way of life.

In October 2015, Kapoor flew to Mumbai after an internal injury in her eye – an unknown object flew into her eye which caused a scratch in her cornea. After her treatment, she returned to the city the same month to continue filming.

In June 2016, it was reported that while shooting a live concert sequence, Rampal and Kohli got into a major fight due to creative differences which resulted in the shooting getting stalled for nearly an hour. The incident took place at the Gateway of India in Mumbai where the film was being wrapped with a song shoot. Akhtar, who at first was oblivious to the upheaval situation when he heard about the incident, met the two men in their respective vanity vans and was able to calm them down. The shoot then resumed thereafter and went on smoothly with all three actors returning to the stage. However, Saudagar rebuffed these allegations saying that such an incident never took place.

The film had to undergo ten days of reshoots just two weeks before its premiere, making it a rare occurrence in Bollywood. According to an undisclosed source by the Deccan Chronicle, this was done in order to enhance the film. Such claim was also nevertheless dismissed by Saudagar but he said that there were some delays in shooting due to rain in Shillong. Additionally, shooting for the "You Know What I Mean" song took place in Madh Island in Mumbai. Pre-production took place for 77 days while filming lasted for a total of 66 days, ending on 17 June 2016.

Post-production
Due to part of a Hindi dialogue being spoken unclear by a character from Meghalaya, the CBFC requested the producers to re-dub the dialogues for clarity.

Release
The film was released in theaters in India on 11 November 2016. The film was passed with a UA certificate by the CBFC with almost no cuts. On 8 November, three days before the film's release, Prime Minister Narendra Modi announced that the country's two currencies – 500 and 1000 – would be demonetized from the next day onwards as a means to counter fake currency and exterminate black money and corruption. This would mean that it would not be possible for patrons to purchase tickets from box office using the old notes until Thursday, 10 November, when new 500 and 2000 notes will be issued. In order to curb this problem, the film partnered with theater chain PVR Cinemas where ticket buyers will be able to evade paying convenience fees in the company's website and app respectively.

The release date was almost postponed following the demonetization of the said currencies as it would have caused hindrance and limit the purchase of tickets by patrons. However, this decision was later scrapped since the film had already been released in the Gulf and such a decision would lead to piracy. The weekend's two other releases – Saansein and 30 Minutes – were however rescheduled.

Marketing

While the film is predominantly aimed at younger demographics, Excel Entertainment carried out a marketing plan in order to appeal to a much wider audience. The film recouped 8–10 crore from various brand tie-ups alone. The first poster was released on 2 September. A live concert by the stars and music directors was held in National Sports Club of India in Mumbai on 17 September, for the album launch. Akhtar and Kapoor, along with members of the former's Farhan Live band embarked on a nationwide concert tour such as in Bangalore, Aurangabad, Maharashtra on 2 November and Hyderabad on 6 November. Akhtar performed at the annual 2016 NH7 Weekender held in Bhoirymbong in Ri-Bhoi district, Meghalaya from 21 to 22 October. The first trailer was launched on 24 October in presence of the cast members. In October, Rampal, Akhtar, Kapoor and Desai made an appearance on The Kapil Sharma Show. On 8 November, the band held a concert at one of University of Delhi's Ramjas College in New Delhi. The band were originally set to perform in one of the university's other college, Kirori Mal College, which is the alma-mater of Kapoor's father, Shakti Kapoor. But permissions were not granted for performing there due to unavailability of the place on the ground that the staff council allows concerts only during the fest and not for any other event. Due to her commitments over the film, Kapoor decided to put a hold for her shooting schedule her upcoming film, Haseena, until December 2016 in order for her to promote the sequel more robustly. She also delayed a flight to the United States in September 2016 for her Half Girlfriend shooting schedule for the same reason.

The film signed with 10 various brand associations which served as promotional partners, such as Hexa from Tata Motors, Amul, Boat Speakers, Regal Shoes, Nutrilite, Vodafone, Spunk Apparels, Cromā, hike Messenger and Zippo.

Soundtrack

The film's accompanying soundtrack on the film is composed by Shankar–Ehsaan–Loy. Akhtar and Kapoor sang all parts of their respective songs. The soundtrack was as pivotal as the script according to Saudagar. They didn't want just a few hit songs. Shankar composed the music side by side when Chaudhuri was working on the script. The soundtrack also features music from Shillong-based band Somersault.

Track listing

Reception

Box office
International Business Times pointed out that the continued run of Ae Dil Hai Mushkil and Shivaay as well as the ban of the use of 500 and 1000 currencies were all (negative) factors in determining the film's opening performance. The film is releasing across approximately 1,700 screens the same day as Chaar Sahibzaade: Rise of Banda Singh Bahadur, making it a rare occurrence in Bollywood that two sequels are releasing on the same date.

The prime factor for the film's low performance was the demonetization of the two currencies as people nationwide were more pre-occupied with depositing, exchanging and withdrawing the currencies and the money would be allocated to other needful resources other than movie tickets since people would want to forgo waiting in long queues as bank would constantly run out of cash. Producer Sidhwani lamented on the performance saying, "We have made a beautiful film and by the time announcement was made, it was Wednesday and the prints were already out. We couldn't afford to push the release date as the piracy laws in our country are not strong enough to protect the movie from getting leaked. Our two years of efforts would have been wasted." He also pointed out that had the postponement decision been made a week before, then they would have gone with it. The film was termed as a disaster by Box Office India because of demonetization.

Critical reception
The film garnered polarized reception from critics. Praise was aimed at the cast's performances and Marc Koninckx's cinematography, while its screenplay and soundtrack received negative reception.

The Economic Times lauded the film, giving it 4½ stars out of 5 and writing that the film is pretty much the most engaging and authentic sequel to come out of Bollywood in recent memory. Rohit Vats of The Hindustan Times wrote, "Rock On 2 might not have a strong conflict in the storyline, but it definitely works as the narrative of a unique camaraderie among the boys."

References

External links
 
 
 Rock On 2 at Rotten Tomatoes

2010s Hindi-language films
2010s buddy films
2010s musical drama films
2000s musical drama films
Films set in India
Indian buddy films
Indian musical drama films
Indian rock music films
Films shot in Shillong
2016 drama films